Bluszczów  (German Bluschau) is a village in the administrative district of Gmina Gorzyce, within Wodzisław County, Silesian Voivodeship, in southern Poland, close to the Czech border.

The village has a population of 1,201.

In the village there was a railway station called "Bluszczów" probably to 2005 (this a reason there is a "Dworcowa" street, which means "Railway station", and usually is located in most town, cities in Poland where is or was building, sometimes railway stop/platform only).

References

Villages in Wodzisław County